Leina Kauhane (meaning "leaping place of ghosts") is white rock located approximately  offshore on the northwest area of the Hawaiian island Oahu. It is noted in Hawaiian folklore as the point where souls of the dead journey into the afterlife (Lua-o-Milu) and overlooks the ocean. The term Rienga (lit., "the leaping place") is used in New Zealand and is considered to parallel this concept. Suitably, within their belief system, the Marquesans applied it to the northernmost island of their region as well.

References

Hawaii folklore
Geography of Hawaii by island
Geography of Oahu